Jean Manoussi (14 November 1868 - 21 December 1929) was a French dramatist, film director and screenwriter. Jean Manoussi has written several theatre plays in collaboration with playwrights such as Paul Armont, Marcel Gerbidon or Gabriel Timmory.

Theatre 
 1902 : Un beau mariage, cowritten with Gabriel Timmory
 1903 : Petite bonne sérieuse, cowritten with Gabriel Timmory 
 1904 : Pomme de terre, cowritten with Gabriel Timmory
 1909 : Un cambrioleur ingénieux, cowritten with Gabriel Timmory
 1913 : Le Chevalier au masque, cowritten with Paul Armont
 1916 : La Ventouse, cowritten with Marcel Nancey
 1923 : Dicky, cowritten with Paul Armont and Marcel Gerbidon

Filmography 
as director
 1919 : Fanny Lear, cowritten with Robert Boudrioz, after Ludovic Halévy and Henri Meilhac,
 1919 : L'Homme bleu after the novel by Georges Le Faure
 1920 : Illusions
 1922 : Le Grillon du foyer
 1923 : Le Dernier des Capendu
 1925 : The Painter and His Model, German film of the Maxim-Film Ges. Ebner & Co in Berlin
 1926 : Fedora, also screenwriter, after the play by Victorien Sardou 
 1926 : Ma maison de Saint-Cloud after the novel by Paul Bourget

As screenwriter
 1909 : Un cambrioleur ingénieux
 1927 : Le Secret de Délia or L'Évadée by Henri Ménessier after a play by Victorien Sardou

Cinema adaptations 
 1936 : The Mysterious Mister X by Johann Alexander Hübler-Kahla after Dicky (1923)
 1938 :  by Robert Péguy after Dicky (1923)
 1940 :  by Raffaello Matarazzo after Dicky (1923)
 1955 : The Purple Mask by H. Bruce Humberstone after Le Chevalier au masque (1913)

External links 

 
 lesgensducinema.com

20th-century French dramatists and playwrights
French film directors
20th-century French screenwriters
Mass media people from Marseille
1860s births
1929 deaths